Warren Howard Young (born January 11, 1956) is a Canadian former professional ice hockey left winger who played seven seasons in the National Hockey League (NHL) for the Minnesota North Stars, Pittsburgh Penguins and Detroit Red Wings.

Playing career
Young was born in Toronto, Ontario. As a youth, he played in the 1968 Quebec International Pee-Wee Hockey Tournament with the Toronto Humberview minor ice hockey team.

He was selected in the 4th Round, 59th overall by the California Seals in the 1976 NHL Amateur Draft and the 7th round, 74th overall by the New England Whalers in the 1976 WHA Amateur Draft. He chose instead to play college hockey for Michigan Tech.  Upon graduating, he spent three years playing in the minor leagues before being signed as a free agent by the North Stars in 1981, and made his NHL debut that year.  He appeared in five games with the North Stars before he was signed as a free agent by the Penguins in 1983.  In his first full season of 1984–85, he scored 40 goals and was named to the NHL All-Rookie Team that season.  His emergence with the Penguins led many teams to increase their scouting of players at the college level.  He left the Penguins following that season to sign with the Red Wings but was dealt back to Pittsburgh after one season.  He retired in 1988 after playing 236 games in the NHL, scoring 72 goals.

In 1993-94, Young played four games with the Pittsburgh Phantoms of Roller Hockey International.

Awards and achievements
1984–85 NHL All-Rookie Team

Career statistics

References

1956 births
Living people
Baltimore Clippers (1979–81) players
Baltimore Skipjacks players
Birmingham South Stars players
California Golden Seals draft picks
Detroit Red Wings players
ECHL coaches
Michigan Tech Huskies men's ice hockey players
Minnesota North Stars players
Muskegon Lumberjacks players
Nashville South Stars players
New England Whalers draft picks
Oklahoma City Stars players
Pittsburgh Penguins players
Pittsburgh Penguins scouts
Pittsburgh Phantoms (RHI) players
Ice hockey people from Toronto
Canadian ice hockey centres
Canadian ice hockey coaches